Masters W75 shot put world record progression is the progression of world record improvements of the shot put W75 division of Masters athletics.  Records must be set in properly conducted, official competitions under the standing IAAF rules unless modified by World Masters Athletics.  

The W75 division consists of female athletes who have reached the age of 75 but have not yet reached the age of 80, so exactly from their 75th birthday to the day before their 80th birthday. Since 2010, the W75 division throws a 2 kg implement.  Prior to that, the division threw a 3 kg implement, so both progressions are included here.

Key

2.0 Kg Shot Put

3.0 Kg Shot Put

References

Masters Athletics Shot Put list
All Time Athletics

Masters athletics world record progressions
Shot